This is a partial list of night markets in Taiwan sorted by location.

Northern Taiwan

Keelung
Miaokou Night Market, Ren'ai (廟口夜市)

Taipei
 Dalong Night Market, Datong (大龍街夜市)
 Gongguan Night Market, Zhongzheng (公館夜市)
 Guangzhou Street Night Market, Wanhua (廣州街夜市)
 Huaxi Street Tourist Night Market, Wanhua (華西街觀光夜市)
 Jingmei Night Market, Wenshan (景美夜市)
 Liaoning Street Night Market, Zhongshan (遼寧街夜市)
 Linkou Night Market, Xinyi (林口街夜市)
 Nanjichang Night Market, Zhongzheng (南機場夜市)
 Ningxia Night Market, Datong (寧夏夜市)
 Raohe Street Night Market, Songshan (饒河街觀光夜市)
 Shida Night Market, Daan (師大路夜市)
 Shilin Night Market, Shilin (士林夜市)
 Shipai Night Market, Beitou (石牌夜市)
 Shuang Cheng Street Night Market, Zhongshan (雙成街夜市)
 Tonghua Street (Linjiang Street) Night Market, Daan (通化街夜市)
 Yansan Night Market, Datong (延三夜市)
 737 Night Market, Neihu (737夜市)

New Taipei
Datong Night Market, Sanchong (大同夜市)
Fu-Da Night Market, Taishan (輔大夜市)
Lehua Night Market, Yonghe (樂華夜市)
Luzhou Night Market, Luzhou (蘆洲夜市)
Nanya Night Market, Banqiao (南雅夜市)
Sanhe Night Market, Sanchong (三和夜市)
Sanxia Night Market, Sanxia (三峽夜市)
Sanzhi Night Market, Sanzhi (三芝夜市)
Tamsui Night Market, Tamsui (淡水夜市)
Xingnan Night Market, Zhonghe (興南夜市)
Xinzhuang Night Market, Xinzhuang (新莊夜市)
Zhongyang Night Market, Sanchong (中央夜市)

Yilan County
Luodong Night Market, Luodong (羅東夜市)
Toucheng Night Market, Toucheng (頭城夜市)
Yilan Night Market, Yilan City (宜蘭夜市)

Taoyuan City

Chungyuan Night Market, Zhongli District (中原夜市)
Taoyuan Tourism Night Market, Taoyuan District (桃園觀光夜市)
Zhongli Sinming Night Market, Zhongli District (中壢新明夜市)

Hsinchu City
City God Temple Night Market, North (城隍廟夜市)
Huayuan Street Night Market, East (花園街夜市)
Qingda Night Market, East (清大夜市)
Zhongzhengtai Night Market, Hsinchu (中正台夜市)

Central Taiwan

Taichung City
Fengjia Night Market, Xitun (逢甲夜市)
Fengyuan Miao Dong Night Market (豐原廟東夜市)
Tung Hai Night Market 
Yizhong Street Night Market (一中夜市)
Zhonghua Night Market

Changhua County
Lugang Night Market (鹿港夜市)
Jingcheng Night Market (精誠夜市)

Nantou County
 Caotun Night Market (草鞋墩人文觀光夜市)

Southern Taiwan

Chiayi City
 Carrefour Night Market
 Chia-Le-Fu Night Market 
 Wenhua Road Night Market (文化路夜市)

Tainan City
Dadong Night Market, East (大東夜市)
Fu-Hwa Night Market, Yongkang (復華夜市)
Tainan Flower Night Market, North (花園夜市)
Wusheng Night Market, West Central (武聖夜市)
Xiaobei Night Market, North (小北成功夜市)

Kaohsiung City
Hsinshing Night Market
Kaisyuan Night Market (凱旋夜市)
Liuhe Night Market, Sinsing (六合夜市)
Ruifeng Night Market, Zuoying (瑞豐夜市)
Zhonghua Street Night Market (中華街觀光夜市)

Pingtung County
 Minzu Night Market
 Ruiguang Night Market

East Taiwan

Hualien County
 Dongdamen Night Market, Hualien City (東大門夜市)
 Nanpin Night Market, Hualien City
 Ziqiang Night Market, Hualien City

See also
 List of tourist attractions in Taiwan

External links 
 Taiwan Night Markets in Google Maps
 Night markets from ROC Tourism Bureau

References 
 Night markets from Taoyuan County Government

Retailing-related lists